The Vernacular Architecture Forum (VAF) is a scholarly organization founded in 1980 to support the study and preservation of all aspects of vernacular architecture and landscapes.  The organization has brought together scholars and practitioners from a wide variety of disciplines--geography, folklore, architecture, landscape architecture, historic preservation and others.  The Vernacular Architecture Forum holds an annual meeting, conducts tours, and publishes the quarterly Vernacular Architecture Newsletter and the annual journal Buildings & Landscapes: Journal of the Vernacular Architecture Forum.  In 2007, VAF had more than 800 members.

The annual journal of VAF was initiated in 1982 as a series of books titled Perspectives in Vernacular Architecture that contained selected papers from the VAF annual meetings.  In 2007, the publication was retitled Buildings & Landscapes: Journal of the Vernacular Architecture Forum reflecting its current formatting as a scholarly journal publishing a wide range of vernacular research.

The VAF expanded publication of special interest topics in the field of vernacular architecture and landscapes beginning with Invitation to Vernacular Architecture: A Guide to the Study of Ordinary Buildings and Landscapes.

See also
 Vernacular architecture

External links
 Vernacular Architecture Forum (VAF) official website

References

Architecture organizations based in the United States
Vernacular architecture in the United States
Indigenous architecture
Professional associations based in the United States
Arts organizations established in 1980
1980 establishments in the United States